The Halfpenny Rose Red, first issued on 1 October 1870, was the first halfpenny postage stamp issued in the United Kingdom.

The halfpenny stamp was introduced following a reduction in the postal rate for newspapers and postcards.

The stamps  (nicknamed 'Bantams' due to their small size) were printed in sheets of 480 (20 horizontal rows of 24 stamps). They were line engraved and featured a bust of Queen Victoria in profile with '½d' on either side.

A plate number was engraved in the design, in the left and right side lace work. The plates were numbered from 1 to 20, but plates 2, 7, 16, 17, and 18 were not completed, plates 21 and 22 were not used and plate 9 is now scarce because it was a rarely used reserve plate. The stamps were watermarked with the word "halfpenny" that extended across three stamps.

The stamp was replaced in 1880 by the surface printed Halfpenny Green stamp.

See also
 List of British postage stamps
 Postage stamps and postal history of Great Britain

References

Postage stamps of the United Kingdom
Cultural depictions of Queen Victoria